Emile Michael Harry (born April 5, 1963)  is a former professional American football wide receiver. He played in the National Football League for seven seasons for the Kansas City Chiefs (1986–1992) and the Los Angeles Rams (1992).

Biography
Harry was born in Los Angeles and graduated from Fountain Valley High School in Fountain Valley, California. He played college football at Stanford University.
 
He was drafted by the Atlanta Falcons in the 4th round (89th overall) of the 1985 NFL Draft, and played his first game in the NFL with the Kansas City Chiefs during the 1986 season.

References

External links 
 
 TotalFootballStats.com
 databaseFootball.com
 Pro-Football-Reference.Com

1963 births
Living people
Players of American football from Los Angeles
American football wide receivers
Stanford Cardinal football players
Kansas City Chiefs players
Los Angeles Rams players